Nur Herman Majid (born 2 August 1969) is a retired Malaysian who specialised in the sprint hurdles. He represented his country at the 1992 Summer Olympics as well as two indoor and one outdoor World Championships. In addition he won multiple medals on regional level.

His personal bests are 13.73 seconds in the 110 metres hurdles (+1.6 m/s, Hiroshima 1994) and 8.03 seconds in the 60 metres hurdles (Barcelona 1995). His 110 metres hurdles national record was broken in 2017 by Rayzam Shah Wan Sofian.

Competition record

Honours

Honour of Malaysia
  : 
 Member of the Order of the Defender of the Realm (A.M.N.) (1992)

References

1969 births
Living people
Malaysian male hurdlers
Olympic athletes of Malaysia
Athletes (track and field) at the 1992 Summer Olympics
Athletes (track and field) at the 1994 Asian Games
Asian Games bronze medalists for Malaysia
Asian Games medalists in athletics (track and field)
Commonwealth Games competitors for Malaysia
Athletes (track and field) at the 1994 Commonwealth Games
Athletes (track and field) at the 1998 Commonwealth Games
World Athletics Championships athletes for Malaysia
Southeast Asian Games medalists in athletics
Southeast Asian Games gold medalists for Malaysia
Members of the Order of the Defender of the Realm
Medalists at the 1994 Asian Games
Competitors at the 1991 Southeast Asian Games
Competitors at the 1993 Southeast Asian Games
Competitors at the 1995 Southeast Asian Games
Competitors at the 1997 Southeast Asian Games
Competitors at the 1999 Southeast Asian Games
Competitors at the 2001 Southeast Asian Games